The Dragon is a one-design keelboat designed by Norwegian Johan Anker in 1929. In 1948 the Dragon became an Olympic Class, a status it retained until the Munich Olympics in 1972. The Dragon's long keel and elegant metre-boat lines remain unchanged, but today Dragons are constructed using the latest technology to make the boat durable and easy to maintain. GRP construction was introduced in 1973 and the rigging has been regularly updated.

The Dragon class is actively represented in over 26 countries on 5 continents. By 2004 there were 1,444 boats registered, and the number of boats built has averaged 45 per year. There are many more which are used for day sailing. The World Championships are held in every odd year and the European Championships are held annually. The Gold Cup, which can only be held in certain specified European countries, is unique in that all six races count without discard. It is held annually and often attracts over 100 entries, usually starting in one fleet.

A strong Class Association manages the class rules carefully to ensure safety, high quality and uniformity. Spars and sails have a wide range of adjustment during racing, allowing a skillful crew to optimize the boat for any conditions. Crew weight limits, and restrictions on hiking out allow the Dragon to be raced successfully by a range of ages and both genders. It is possible to tow the Dragon behind many vehicles. It is often dry-sailed. It may be raced against boats of other classes, employing a Portsmouth Yardstick handicap of 986 or a D-PN of 89.5.

History
After the Second World War, the boat was considered slow, and genoa and spinnaker were introduced.

The Dragon was one of the Vintage Yachting Classes in the Vintage Yachting Games in 2008 and 2012.

Events

Olympic Games

World Championships

Vintage Yachting Games

European Championships 

In memory of Madame Virginie Hériot and in accordance with her often expressed wish to encourage yachting, the Committee of the Yacht Club de France decided at a meeting on 21 May 1946 to initiate an International Cup and name it the "Coupe Virginie Hériot". The Cup is assigned to the International Dragon Class, but remains the property of the Yacht Club de France.
In agreement with the Committee of the International Dragon Association the "Coupe Virginie Hériot" is the main trophy of the European Dragon Championship. The event is now held annually.

Gold Cup 

The International Dragon Cup was presented in 1937 by members of the Clyde Yacht's Conference with the intention of bringing together as many competitors of different nationalities as possible for yacht racing in Europe in a friendly spirit, in order to perpetuate the good feeling which existed at the first International Clyde Fortnight. The Clyde Yacht Clubs' Conference has been reconstituted as the Clyde Yacht Clubs' Association and the International Dragon Cup has become known as, and is now renamed, the 'Dragon Gold Cup'.

Members of the Clyde Yacht Clubs' Association created specific rules for this competition and donated a perpetual trophy made of pure gold for an annual international race.
From the beginning, the Gold Cup was considered a family event for the Dragon Sailors and could be raced by yachts of the International Dragon Class belonging to any country, and for this reason was a very well attended event.

Until 1965, the year of the first Official World Championship, the Gold Cup was considered the unofficial World Cup. The first rules created by the Clyde Yacht Clubs' Association established that the Cup should be sailed annually and that the Cup should be retained by the winner for one year only. It also established that the event should take place in rotation in the following countries: Scotland, France, Sweden, Germany, Holland and Denmark.

With the revision of the rules in 1997, the number of hosting countries was enlarged to eleven: Belgium, Denmark, France, Germany, Ireland, Netherlands, Norway, Portugal, Spain, Sweden and the United Kingdom.

The hosting country and the Organising Authority continue to be selected by the Clyde Yacht Clubs' Association in conjunction with the International Dragon Association and the number of participants was limited to 120.

Class association
The International Dragon Association (IDA) was founded on 31 October 1961 with London as its headquarters.
The principal objects of the IDA are:
 To further the interests of the International Dragon Class in all countries where Dragons are sailed and to introduce the Class to new countries.
 To be responsible for the administration of the class rules and coordinating proposals for rule amendments for consideration by the International Sailing Federation (ISAF).
 To ensure that the class retains its "International" status by complying with the criteria adopted by the ISAF.
 To co-ordinate and select venues for the following international championships:
 World Championships
 European Championships
 Gold Cups
 To produce regular newsletters containing information about the Class and the activities of the IDA for distribution to all Dragon sailors throughout the world.
 Membership is open to National Dragon Class Associations.

Class officers

President 
H.M. King Constantine

Vice-Presidents 
 H.R.H. Crown Prince Frederik of Denmark
 Christopher Dicker
 Poul Richard Høj Jensen

Chairman

References

External links

 Classic Boat's guide to Dragon Class
 International Dragon Class Association WebPage
 Australian Class Link
 USA/CAN Class LInk
 UK Class LInk
 French Class Link
 Dutch Dragon Class
 Belgian Dragon Class

 
Classes of World Sailing
Keelboats
Olympic sailing classes
1920s sailboat type designs
Sailboat type designs by Johan Anker
One-design sailing classes